Three East Indiamen of the East India Company (EIC), have borne the name Hindostan, after the old name for the Indian subcontinent:

  was a former East Indiaman by the same name built by William Barnard at Deptford and launched in 1789. The Admiralty purchased her in 1795 and classed her as a 54-gun fourth rate. She was converted into a storeship in 1802 and burned in an accident in 1804.
  was launched in 1796 and made three trips to the Far East. She was wrecked while outbound in 1803.
 Hindostan was launched in 1813 and brought into the Royal Navy as  that same year. She later served as a convict ship and as transport for immigrants to Australia before being wrecked in 1840.

See also

Ships of the British East India Company
Age of Sail merchant ships
Merchant ships of the United Kingdom
Ship names